Persatuan Sepakbola Delta Khatulistiwa (simply known as PS Delta Khatulistiwa) is an Indonesian football club based in Pontianak, West Kalimantan. They currently compete in the Liga 3 and their homeground is Sultan Syarif Abdurrahman Stadium.

Honours
 Liga 3 West Kalimantan
 Runner-up: 2021

References

External links

Pontianak
Football clubs in Indonesia
Football clubs in West Kalimantan
Association football clubs established in 2008
2008 establishments in Indonesia